"Pop Out" is a song by American rappers Polo G and Lil Tjay.

Pop Out may also refer to:

 PopOut, a rule variation of the Connect Four connection game
 "Pop Out", a song by Katie Got Bandz
 "Pop Out", a song by Lil Yachty from Lil Boat 2
 Pop out, another term for a pop fly in baseball